Geir Lennart Høgsnes (2 December 1950 – 3 June 2009) was a Norwegian sociologist. He did research on labor and wages, and spent the better part of his academic career at the Norwegian Institute for Social Research and the University of Oslo. He was a professor until 2009, when he was found dead in his home under uncertain circumstances.

Academic career
He hailed from Snåsa. He obtained the mag.art. degree (PhD equivalent) in sociology at the University of Oslo in 1981, and took the dr.polit. degree in 1994. He was a researcher at the Norwegian Institute for Social Research from 1981 to 1998, was an associate professor at Norwegian University of Science and Technology from 1996 to 1998 and the University of Oslo from 1999 to 2000. In 2000 he became a professor at the University of Oslo. He headed the Department of Sociology and Human Geography from 2002 to 2007.

He was the editor of the journal Tidsskrift for samfunnsforskning from 1999 to 2005.

He has been interviewed about the disparity between men's and women's earnings and on strike actions by Norwegian workers. He has also done research on the role of women, elderly workers and immigrants in Norway's labor market.

Selected bibliography
Krone for krone. Lønnsforhandlinger og -fordelinger, 1999
"Decentralized Wage Bargaining - A Threat to Incomes Policy Goals or an Instrument of Flexibility?", with Frode Longva. In Henry Milner and Eskil Wadensjö (eds.), Gösta Rehn, the Swedish Model and Labour Market Policies, 2001
"Arbeidsliv, lønn og forhandlinger", with Arvid Fennefoss. In Ivar Frønes & Lise Kjølsrød (eds.), Det norske samfunn, 2003

Death
Høgsnes was found dead with his wife, whom he had married three months earlier, in their Uranienborg apartment on 3 June 2009. His wife, a Chinese citizen, reportedly wrote a goodbye letter styled to her family in Chinese. Other clues were scarce, but the police speculated that his wife was behind the death, or that it may have been a double suicide.

References

1950 births
2009 deaths
People from Snåsa
Norwegian sociologists
University of Oslo alumni
Academic staff of the Norwegian University of Science and Technology
Academic staff of the University of Oslo